Cobubatha lixiva is a species of moth in the family Noctuidae (the owlet moths).

The MONA or Hodges number for Cobubatha lixiva is 9014.

References

Further reading

 
 
 

Eustrotiinae
Articles created by Qbugbot
Moths described in 1882